Macbeth is a silent, black-and-white 1916 film adaptation of the William Shakespeare play Macbeth. It was directed by John Emerson, assisted by Erich von Stroheim, and  produced by D. W. Griffith, with cinematography by Victor Fleming. The film starred Herbert Beerbohm Tree and Constance Collier, both famous from the stage and for playing Shakespearean parts. Although released during the first decade of feature filmmaking, it was already the seventh version of Macbeth to be produced, one of eight during the silent film era. It is considered to be a lost film.

In the companion book to his Hollywood television series, Kevin Brownlow states that Sir Herbert failed to understand that the production was a silent film and that speech was not needed so much as pantomime. Tree, who had performed the play numerous times on the stage, kept spouting reams of dialogue. So Emerson and Fleming simply removed the film and cranked an empty camera so as not to waste film when he did so.

Cast
Sir Herbert Beerbohm Tree as Macbeth
Constance Collier as Lady Macbeth
Wilfred Lucas as Macduff
Spottiswoode Aitken as Duncan
Ralph Lewis as Banquo
Mary Alden as Lady Macduff
Olga Grey as Lady Agnes
Lawrence Noskowski as Malcolm
Bessie Buskirk as Donalbain
Jack Conway as Lennox
Seymour Hastings as Ross
Karl Formes, Jr. as the Bishop
Jack Brammal as Seyton
L. Tylden as First Witch
Scott McKee as Second Witch
Jack Leonard as Third Witch
Francis Carpenter, Thema Burns and Madge Dyer as Macduff's children
Raymond Wells as the Thane of Cawdor
George McKenzie as the Doctor
Chandler House as Fleance
Monte Blue (Stunt double for Herbert Tree)

Further reading

References

External links

allmovie/synopsis; Macbeth
 Beerbohm Tree and Constance Collier in the film
another scene with Tree and Connie Collier(Univ of Washington, Sayre collection)

American silent feature films
Films based on Macbeth
Films directed by John Emerson
Lost American films
Films with screenplays by Anita Loos
American black-and-white films
1910s American films